In mathematics, a unipotent element r of a ring R is one such that r − 1 is a nilpotent element; in other words, (r − 1)n is zero for some n.

In particular, a square matrix M is a unipotent matrix if and only if its characteristic polynomial P(t) is a power of t − 1. Thus all the eigenvalues of a unipotent matrix are 1.  

The term quasi-unipotent means that some power is unipotent, for example for a diagonalizable matrix with eigenvalues that are all roots of unity.  

In the theory of algebraic groups, a group element is unipotent if it acts unipotently in a certain natural group representation.  A unipotent affine algebraic group is then a group with all elements unipotent.

Definition

Definition with matrices 
Consider the group  of upper-triangular matrices with 's along the diagonal, so they are the group of matrices

Using scheme theory the group  can be defined as the group scheme

and an affine group scheme is unipotent if it is a closed group scheme of this scheme.

Definition with ring theory 
An element x of an affine algebraic group is unipotent when its associated right translation operator, rx, on the affine coordinate ring A[G] of G is locally unipotent as an element of the ring of linear endomorphism of A[G]. (Locally unipotent means that its restriction to any finite-dimensional stable subspace of A[G] is unipotent in the usual ring-theoretic sense.)

An affine algebraic group is called unipotent if all its elements are unipotent. Any unipotent algebraic group is isomorphic to a closed subgroup of the group of upper triangular matrices with diagonal entries 1, and conversely any such subgroup is unipotent. In particular any unipotent group is a nilpotent group, though the converse is not true (counterexample: the diagonal matrices of GLn(k)).

Definition with representation theory 
If a unipotent group acts on an affine variety, all its orbits are closed, and if it acts linearly on a finite-dimensional vector space then it has a non-zero fixed vector. In fact, the latter property characterizes unipotent groups. In particular, this implies there are no non-trivial semisimple representations.

Examples

Un 
Of course, the group of matrices  is unipotent. Using the lower central series

where
 and 
there are associated unipotent groups.
given some induced examples of unipotent groups.

Gan 
The additive group  is a unipotent group through the embedding

Notice the matrix multiplication gives

hence this is a group embedding. More generally, there is an embedding  from the map

Using scheme theory,  is given by the functor

where

Kernel of the Frobenius 
Consider the functor  on the subcategory , there is the subfunctor  where

so it is given by the kernel of the Frobenius endomorphism.

Classification of unipotent groups over characteristic 0 
Over characteristic 0 there is a nice classification of unipotent algebraic groups with respect to nilpotent Lie algebras. Recall that a nilpotent Lie algebra is a subalgebra of some  such that the iterated adjoint action eventually terminates to the zero-map.

Then, there is an equivalence of categories of finite-dimensional nilpotent Lie algebras and unipotent algebraic groups.page 261 This can be constructed using the Baker–Campbell–Hausdorff series , where given a finite-dimensional nilpotent Lie algebra, the map

In the other direction the exponential map takes any nilpotent square matrix to a unipotent matrix. Moreover, if U is a commutative unipotent group, the exponential map induces an isomorphism from the Lie algebra of U to U itself.

Remarks 
Unipotent groups over an algebraically closed field of any given dimension can in principle be classified, but in practice the complexity of the classification increases very rapidly with the dimension, so people tend to give up somewhere around dimension 6.

Unipotent radical
The unipotent radical of an algebraic group G is the set of unipotent elements in the radical of G. It is a connected unipotent normal subgroup of G, and contains all other such subgroups. A group is called reductive if its unipotent radical is trivial. If G is reductive then its radical is a torus.

Decomposition of algebraic groups 
Algebraic groups can be decomposed into unipotent groups, multiplicative groups, and abelian varieties, but the statement of how they decompose depends upon the characteristic of their base field.

Characteristic 0 
Over characteristic 0 there is a nice decomposition theorem of an algebraic group  relating its structure to the structure of a linear algebraic group and an Abelian variety. There is a short exact sequence of groupspage 8

Characteristic p 
When the characteristic of the base field is p there is an analogous statement for an algebraic group : there exists a smallest subgroup  such that

  is a unipotent group
  is an extension of an abelian variety  by a group  of multiplicative type.

Jordan decomposition 

Any element g of a linear algebraic group over a perfect field can be written uniquely as the product g = gu&hairsp;&hairsp;gs of commuting unipotent and semisimple elements gu and gs. In the case of the group GLn(C), this essentially says that any invertible complex matrix is conjugate to the product of a diagonal matrix and an upper triangular one, which is (more or less) the multiplicative version of the Jordan–Chevalley decomposition.

There is also a version of the Jordan decomposition for groups: 
any commutative linear algebraic group over a perfect field is the product of a unipotent group and a semisimple group.

See also

Reductive group
Unipotent representation
Deligne–Lusztig theory

References

A. Borel, Linear algebraic groups, 

Ring theory
Matrix theory
Algebraic groups